William Hutchison (1841 – 15 August 1914), born near Moonee Ponds, Victoria, was a horse breeder and pastoralist in the South East of South Australia, remembered for his successful libel suit against the proprietors and editor of The Narracoorte Herald.

His father John Hutchison ( – 1843) of Leith, Scotland arrived in Melbourne, Victoria in December 1839, by the ship St. Mungo, and took up land there for a cattle station. His father died and his mother (née McKenzie) married Andrew Dunn (1819 – 12 December 1901) and moved to Dunnoo Dunnoo near Edenhope, Victoria. After a dispute with neighbors regarding the legality of the land they were occupying, they moved in 1848 to Barooka, near Kingston SE in South Australia. Around 1850 they moved to Woolmit, previously known as Biscuit Flat,  from Robe. William was educated at John Whinham's North Adelaide Grammar School. In 1862 Hutchison and Dunn purchased Murra Binna station from "Tommy" Woods, and ran that property, where he was a successful racehorse breeder and Adam Lindsay Gordon was a frequent visitor. Hutchison acquired considerable additional property by the illegal process known as "dummying", using third parties who owned no property to "select" Government land secretly on his behalf. George Ash, of The Narracoorte Herald in an editorial questioned his fitness to hold the position of Justice of the Peace, and was successfully (and ruinously) sued by Hutchison, whose lawyer, Josiah Symon, QC conducted a masterfully technical case against Ash, which rendered practically all his evidence, including Crown Law documents and Hansard inadmissible.

Hutchison, who was badly affected by the Depression of the early 1890s, left Morambro for Victoria around 1895, settled in Gippsland, and died in Malvern.

Family
Hutchison married Harriett Reid (c. 1840 – 21 September 1880) on 10 May 1864. Harriett was a sister of the Rev. Richardson Reid, of Trinity Church, Adelaide. They had five sons:
William John Reid Hutchison (9 April 1873 – ) married Annie Elizabeth Cooke ( – ) on 28 April 1896, lived at Magill, South Australia
J. R. Hutchison, of Padthaway, South Australia
A. R. Hutchison, of Narracoorte
Egbert William "Bert" Hutchison ( – 14 August 1925) of Melbourne
A. J. Hutchison of Narracoorte
He married again, to Julia Reid ( – 24 January 1916) on 6 September 1881. Julia was the widow of Inspector Reid, and had a daughter Alice Ann Reid ( – ), who married John Thomas Morris of Kalangadoo on 20 January 1887.

References 

Australian pastoralists
Australian racehorse owners and breeders
1841 births
1914 deaths
19th-century Australian businesspeople
People from Victoria (Australia)
Australian people of Scottish descent